John Pawlowski (born September 6, 1963) is an American baseball coach and former pitcher. He played college baseball at Clemson for coach Bill Wilhelm from 1983 to 1985 and in Major League Baseball (MLB) for 2 seasons from 1987 to 1988. He then served as head coach of the College of Charleston Cougars (2000–2008), the Auburn Tigers (2009–2013) and the Western Kentucky Hilltoppers (2016–2022).

Playing career

Pawlowski attended Seton Catholic Central High School in Binghamton, New York and played college baseball at Clemson.

Pawlowski had a short career in the Major Leagues with the Chicago White Sox where he played on the 1987 and 1988 teams, appearing as a pitcher in eight total games.

Coaching career
On June 20, 2008, Pawlowski was named the head baseball coach of the Auburn Tigers. In 2009, his first season with Auburn, the Tigers finished with a 31–25 record, and just 11 wins in Southeastern Conference (SEC) play. In 2010, he responded with a 38–17 and 20 SEC win season, making it the most SEC wins an Auburn team has ever had in the regular season. The team had a losing league record for the next three seasons, however, and Pawlowski was fired at the end of the 2013 season.

On June 4, 2015, Pawlowski was named the head coach of the Western Kentucky Hilltoppers. On May 18, 2022, Pawlowski submitted his resignation effective at the end of the season.

Head coaching record

References

External links

1963 births
Living people
American expatriate baseball players in Canada
American people of Polish descent
Arizona State Sun Devils baseball coaches
Auburn Tigers baseball coaches
Baseball coaches from New York (state)
Baseball players from New York (state)
Birmingham Barons players
Chicago White Sox players
Clemson Tigers baseball coaches
Clemson Tigers baseball players
College of Charleston Cougars baseball coaches
Edmonton Trappers players
Hagerstown Suns players
Major League Baseball pitchers
Midland Angels players
Niagara Falls Sox players
Peninsula White Sox players
People from Johnson City, New York
San Diego State Aztecs baseball coaches
Vancouver Canadians players
Western Kentucky Hilltoppers baseball coaches